Gilbert David Galle (November 18, 1918 – November 26, 2007) was an American football coach. He was the head football coach at Bethel College in North Newton, Kansas, serving for one season, in 1953, and compiling a record of 1–7–1.

Head coaching record

References

External links
 

1918 births
2007 deaths
Bethel Threshers football coaches
People from McPherson County, Kansas